The 2016–17 Czech Cup, known as the MOL Cup for sponsorship reasons, was the 24th season of the annual knockout football tournament of the Czech Republic. It began with the preliminary round on 22 July 2016 and ended with the final in May 2017. The winner of the cup gained the right to play in the group stage of the 2017–18 UEFA Europa League.

Preliminary round
The preliminary round ties are scheduled for 22 – 24 July 2016. 70 teams compete in this round, all from level 4 or below of the Czech league system.

First round

Second round
All times listed below are at CEST

Third round
All times listed below are at CEST

Fourth round
All times listed below are at CEST

Quarter-finals

Semi-finals

Final

See also
 2016–17 Czech First League
 2016–17 Czech National Football League

References

External links
Season on soccerway.com

Czech Cup seasons
Cup
Czech